Thriller was a short-lived comic book series published by DC Comics beginning in November 1983. The series was originally written by Robert Loren Fleming and drawn by Trevor Von Eeden. It was sold only through the direct market. The taglines for the series were, "She has 7 seconds to save the world" and "You can't read it fast enough". The "she" in question was protagonist Angie Thriller. The "7 seconds" referred to a team of operatives who assisted her in various conflicts.

Publication history
Thriller ran for 12 issues (November 1983 – November 1984). After the first seven issues, Fleming left the series and Von Eeden left after issue #8. The series ran four more issues by writer Bill DuBay and artist Alex Niño.

Cast

Angie Thriller
Angeline Marietta Salvotini Thriller was the leader of a team of adventurers called the Seven Seconds, who were based in New York City a subjective "fifty years in the future".

Angeline had the power to become one with any inanimate object, and thus control it.  She could cause her face to appear on an object or even in the sky. The only living beings she could merge with were her twin brother Tony, and the artificially created Beaker Parish. Angeline could also see visions of possible future events.

Very much in the vein of pulp heroes such as The Shadow or Doc Savage, Angie Thriller was described in early publicity as being "like a cross between Jesus Christ and my Mom" by Fleming, and she served as the ethereal leader for her team.

Tony Salvotini
Salvo was Angeline's brother, Tony Salvotini, a former mercenary soldier and member of the U.S. Marines' Rapid Deployment Force. After mistakenly killing an innocent man, Salvo vowed to never again shoot to kill. He would instead only wound his targets, his motto being "only flesh wounds, only out-patients".

The Seven Seconds
Beaker Parish - the test tube experiment of two renegade college science students resulted in a  red-headed priest with unexplained psychic abilities.  Beaker was a childhood friend of Tony and Angie.
Crackerjack - a youthful Honduran pickpocket, who was the ward of Angie's husband, Edward Thriller. He had no given name, assists with the care of Angie and Edward's son, Scotty, and served as an all around "gopher" for the team.
Daniel Grove - a photojournalist who filmed his brother's execution by the villain Scabbard. Grove was saved from Scabbard by Angie, and offered the chance to join the Seven Seconds.
Data - Freddie Martin was the son of the President of the United States. He was the team's communications and information expert, and worked with the team from an enhanced computer system built into his limo, one which Data was physically interfaced with and could never leave.
Proxy - Robert Furillo, Tony's best friend. Bob was an actor, who suffered a disfiguring accident while freebasing drugs. Proxy used a synthetic spray on skin to create new disguises for the team's more covert requirements.
Salvo - Tony Salvotini was Angie's brother and a superhumanly expert marksman.
White Satin - Janet Valentine was Tony's girlfriend, and Quo's ex-wife.  She had extranormal abilities and could disrupt a person's physiology and mental state with a touch. She was also a jet pilot, hence the nickname "Jet", coined by Salvo.

Supporting characters
Edward Thriller - Edward was Angie's scientist husband, whose experiments with alien DNA resulted in his merging bodies with his wife, and resulted in her attaining godlike powers. They could not co-exist in the same place at the same time.
Kane Creole - A second generation clone of Elvis Presley. He started out as an actor doing bank robberies for publicity, but eventually ran afoul of the Seven Seconds and was taken in by Edward.
Mallochia - Scabbard's lover, a woman with psychic powers. She had also once served as Scotty's nanny.
Marietta Salvotini - Tony and Angie's widowed Mother, who operates a diner named "Home". She was originally blinded in a fire (accidentally started by Tony as a child) which claimed the life of her husband, and later gained eyesight and hypnotic powers due to the machinations of Quo.
Quo - Richard Quorum, former husband of Janet Valentine; a student of certain Eastern disciplines. Quo ascended to a higher state and appears usually when events are at a crisis point of some sort.
Scotty Thriller - Angie and Edward's baby boy, who appeared to be perfectly normal in every way.

Plot
The Seven Seconds usually investigated cases involving unusual menaces, some bordering on the supernatural. On their most notable mission, they were able to thwart Moses Lusk's attempt to bring about a nuclear holocaust and destroy all life on Earth.

References

External links

Thriller fan website
Extra content from Ed Catto's Thriller interview, at Comicmix.com

1983 comics debuts
1984 comics endings
DC Comics limited series
DC Comics superhero teams
DC Comics titles